Grace Episcopal Church is a historic Episcopal church located at Middletown in Orange County, New York.  The original church was built between 1846 and 1847, then enlarged and aggrandized in the Gothic Revival style between 1866 and 1868.  A Collegiate Gothic style parish house was added in 1913.  The church features an off-set bell tower with stepped buttresses and Gothic arched windows.

It was listed on the National Register of Historic Places in 2010.

References

External links
church website

Episcopal church buildings in New York (state)
Churches on the National Register of Historic Places in New York (state)
Gothic Revival architecture in New York (state)
Churches completed in 1868
19th-century Episcopal church buildings
Churches in Orange County, New York
National Register of Historic Places in Orange County, New York